Francie Grehan is an Irish former Gaelic footballer who played at senior level for the Roscommon county team between 1998 and 2005. He helped Roscommon win the 2001 Connacht Senior Football Championship, and later won an All Star at centre-back.

Grehan managed Caulry to the 2014 Westmeath Intermediate Football Championship title.

References

 http://hoganstand.com/roscommon/ArticleForm.aspx?ID=25255
 http://hoganstand.com/roscommon/ArticleForm.aspx?ID=25920
 http://hoganstand.com/roscommon/ArticleForm.aspx?ID=25418

Year of birth missing (living people)
Living people
Gaelic football backs
Gaelic football managers
Irish international rules football players
Roscommon inter-county Gaelic footballers
St Aidan's Gaelic footballers